José María Mata Reyes (13 November 1819 – 25 February 1895) was a 19th-century liberal politician and diplomat from Mexico who served for two months as minister of Finance in the cabinet of Benito Juárez (1860–1861), three months as minister of Foreign Affairs in the cabinet of Porfirio Díaz (1878), as envoy extraordinary and minister plenipotentiary of Mexico to the United States (1859–1860), as congressman in the Chamber of Deputies, and as municipal president of Martínez de la Torre, Veracruz.

Aside from his political and diplomatic activities, Mata served as a militiaman during the Mexican–American War and as a general in the army commanded by Porfirio Díaz during the French intervention in Mexico.

Works
  (1868).

Notes and references

1819 births
1895 deaths
Politicians from Xalapa
People from Martínez de la Torre
Mexican Secretaries of Finance
Mexican Secretaries of Foreign Affairs
Ambassadors of Mexico to the United States
Members of the Chamber of Deputies (Mexico)
Presidents of the Chamber of Deputies (Mexico)
Mexican military personnel of the Mexican–American War
Second French intervention in Mexico
19th-century Mexican politicians
19th-century Mexican military personnel
Military personnel from Veracruz